The Merivale River, part of the Darling catchment of the Murray-Darling basin, is a river located in South West Queensland, Australia.

Course and features
The Merivale River rises on the southern slopes of the Carnarvon Range near Mount Eden, part of the southwestern slopes of the Great Dividing Range. The river flows generally in a southerly direction and joins the Maranoa River west of Injune. The Sandy, Box and Smith Creeks are the river's main tributaries. The river descends  over its  course.

See also

References

Rivers of Queensland
Tributaries of the Darling River
South West Queensland